{{Infobox NFL team season
| logo =
| team = Baltimore Ravens
| year = 2011
| record = 12–4 
| division_place = 1st AFC North
| coach = John Harbaugh
| off_coach = Cam Cameron
| def_coach = Chuck Pagano
| general manager = Ozzie Newsome
| owner = Steve Bisciotti
| stadium = M&T Bank Stadium
| playoffs = Won Divisional Playoffs (vs. Texans) 20–13 Lost AFC Championship (at Patriots) 20–23
| super bowl = Won Super Bowl (Giants) 49-17
| pro bowlers = RB Ray RiceFB Vonta LeachG Marshal YandaDT Haloti NgataLB Terrell SuggsLB Ray LewisFS Ed Reed
| uniform = Baltimore ravens uniforms.png
| shortnavlink   = Ravens seasons
}}
The 2011 Baltimore Ravens season was the franchise's 16th season in the National Football League, the fourth under head coach John Harbaugh and their 10th season under general manager Ozzie Newsome.

The 2011 season marked one of the most successful seasons in Baltimore Ravens franchise history. The Ravens completed the season with a 12–4 record, matching their record from 2010, and winning the AFC North division title for the third time in franchise history. By earning a playoff berth in 2011, the Ravens set a franchise record by going to the postseason for four consecutive seasons.

Over his first four years, Harbaugh compiled an overall record of 44–20 in the regular season and 5–4 in the postseason. The Ravens avenged their 2010 divisional round playoff loss against the Steelers in week 1 of the season with a big 35–7 victory at home. The 2011 campaign also marked the first time the Ravens played a Thanksgiving game: the Ravens played the San Francisco 49ers and won 16–6. (San Francisco was coached by John Harbaugh's brother Jim, and many dubbed the Thanksgiving game the "Harbaugh Bowl.") Coincidentally the Ravens and 49ers would meet next year in Super Bowl XLVII, which saw the Ravens win their 2nd title in franchise history.

After defeating the Cincinnati Bengals in week 17, the Ravens earned the first-round bye for the first time since 2006 as the second seed in the AFC. They won the Divisional Round against the Houston Texans but were defeated by the  New England Patriots in the Conference Championship game, 23–20. Lee Evans failed to catch what likely would have been the game-winning touchdown on 2nd down and 1, and Billy Cundiff missed a 32-yard field goal attempt with 11 seconds remaining in regulation.

Linebacker Terrell Suggs was named Defensive Player of the Year.

Offseason

Signings and Re-signings
On July 26, 2011 it was announced that the Ravens had agreed to terms on re-signing G/T Marshal Yanda to a 5-year contract. However, the Ravens could not officially sign him until July 29, 2011.

On July 30, 2011 the Ravens re-signed Cornerback Chris Carr.

On July 31, 2011 the Ravens signed former Texans FB Vonta Leach.

On August 8, 2011 the Ravens signed former Dolphins RB Ricky Williams.

Later on during the pre season, the Ravens added Left tackle Bryant McKinnie from the Minnesota Vikings, Wide Receiver Lee Evans from the Buffalo Bills, and Offensive Center Andre Gurode from the Dallas Cowboys.

Departures and Releases
On July 26, 2011, the Ravens announced that they would release 4 former/current starters, TE Todd Heap, WR Derrick Mason, NT Kelly Gregg, and HB Willis McGahee. The Ravens also said they hope to bring back Heap, Mason, and Gregg at reduced salaries.

Signings by Team:
 WR Donté Stallworth, G/C Chris Chester and CB Josh Wilson signed with the Washington Redskins.
 NT Kelly Gregg, FB Le'Ron McClain and LT Jared Gaither signed with the Kansas City Chiefs.
 HB Willis McGahee signed with the Denver Broncos.
 SS Dawan Landry signed with the Jacksonville Jaguars.
 TE Todd Heap signed with the Arizona Cardinals.
 WR Derrick Mason signed with the New York Jets.

2011 NFL Draft

 The Ravens traded its original fifth-round selection (#157 overall) to the Seattle Seahawks in exchange for CB Josh Wilson.
 Compensatory selection.
 The Ravens acquired this sixth-round selection from the St. Louis Rams in exchange for its original seventh-round selection (#228 overall) and WR Mark Clayton.
 The Ravens acquired this seventh-round selection in a trade that sent DE Antwan Barnes to the Philadelphia Eagles.
 The Ravens held the #26 overall pick, but allowed their 10-minute window to expire before making their selection.  Before the Ravens made their pick, the Kansas City Chiefs holding the following selection picked WR Jon Baldwin, making the Ravens selection #27 overall.
 The Ravens traded the 90th overall pick and a sixth round selection (191st overall) to the Eagles who picked  CB Curtis Marsh and Guard Jason Kelce for the 85th overall pick (Jah Reid)

Personnel
Staff

Final roster

Schedule
Preseason

Regular season

Postseason

Division standings

Game summaries
Regular season
Week 1: vs. Pittsburgh Steelers

On the first play from scrimmage, Ray Rice scampered for 36 yards and would finish the game with 107 rushing yards, in the previous season the Steelers had given up an average of 62.8 rushing yards per game.  Two plays later Joe Flacco threw a 27-yard strike to Anquan Boldin, giving the Ravens a lead they would never relinquish.
Defense would be the story of this game, however, as Terrell Suggs strip-sacked Ben Roethlisberger during the Steelers second possession and Haloti Ngata recovered at the Pittsburgh 37-yard line.  Suggs ended the game with 3 sacks and the Ravens forced 7 turnovers.
With this win not only did the Ravens improve to 1–0, but they handed the Steelers their first opening day loss since 2002.

Week 2: at Tennessee Titans

With this loss, the Ravens fell to 1–1.

Week 3: at St. Louis Rams

Coming off a week 2 loss, the Ravens were determined to bounce back and fight hard. On their second offensive play from scrimmage, Flacco threw a 74-yard touchdown pass to rookie wide receiver Torrey Smith. It was the first catch of Smith's career and the longest pass of Flacco's. Before the first quarter was up, Flacco would throw two more touchdown passes to Smith for 41 and 18 yards respectively, marking the 12th time in NFL history that any receiver caught three touchdown passes in a single quarter, and the first time ever for a rookie. The Ravens would later add 16 more points on three Billy Cundiff field goals and a fumble forced by Ray Lewis and recovered by Haloti Ngata and then run into the end zone (Cundiff also missed two 51-yard field goals). This marked the first and as of 2018 only touchdown in Ngata's career. Offensively, the Ravens gained 553 yards in the entire game, a franchise record. The only score for the Rams came in the third quarter, when quarterback Sam Bradford threw a 34-yard touchdown pass to Brandon Gibson.

With this win, the Ravens improved to 2–1.

Week 4: vs. New York Jets

Coming off their dominating road win over the Rams, the Ravens went home, donned their alternate uniforms, and played a Week 4 Sunday night duel with the New York Jets. Baltimore delivered the game's opening punch with safety Ed Reed forcing a sack-fumble from Jets quarterback Mark Sanchez, allowing linebacker Jameel McClain to recover the fumble and go 6 yards for a touchdown. New York would respond with running back Joe McKnight returning a kickoff 107 yards for a touchdown. Afterwards, the Ravens regained the lead with a 38-yard field goal from kicker Billy Cundiff, followed by a 3-yard touchdown run from running back Ray Rice. Baltimore added onto their lead in the second quarter with another 38-yard field goal from Cundiff, followed by defensive end Haloti Ngata forcing a fumble from Sanchez, allowing linebacker Jarret Johnson to return the fumble 26 yards for a touchdown. The Jets responded with linebacker David Harris returning an interception 36 yards for a touchdown, followed by kicker Nick Folk booting a 40-yard field goal. The Ravens struck back in the third quarter with cornerback Lardarius Webb returning an interception 73 yards for a touchdown. From there, Baltimore's defense prevented any comeback attempt from the Jets.

With this win, the Ravens went into their bye week at 3–1.

Week 6: vs. Houston Texans

With stadium flags lowered to half-mast in remembrance of the passing of Pat Modell, wife of former owner Art Modell, the Ravens set the tone early with a 9-minute, 93-yard drive for a touchdown. Joe Flacco who scored on a quarterback sneak to cap the drive, also threw for 305 yards while Ray Rice ran for 101 yards. Ray Lewis became the first player in NFL history with 40 sacks and 30 interceptions when he sacked Matt Schaub in the first quarter. With this win, the Ravens improved to 4–1.

Week 7: at Jacksonville Jaguars

With this loss, the Ravens fell to 4–2.

Week 8: vs. Arizona Cardinals

With this win, the Ravens improved to 5–2.

Week 9: at Pittsburgh Steelers

As in their previous match this year, the Ravens scored first with an 18-yard field goal by kicker Billy Cundiff, the only points scored in the first quarter by either team.  Steelers kicker Shaun Suisham answered with a 36-yard field goal early in the second quarter, and a 30-yard field goal near the end, but both of these were quickly matched by Baltimore's Cundiff with a 43-yard and 51-yard field goal, respectively, giving Baltimore a 9–6 lead at halftime.  The Ravens then increased their lead in the third quarter when Ray Rice scored the first touchdown of the game on a 4-yard run.  The Steelers rallied in the fourth quarter, with running back Rashard Mendenhall making a 1-yard run to score a touchdown, and then taking the lead for the first time in the game when quarterback Ben Roethlisberger hit  Mike Wallace in the endzone with a 25-yard pass for a second touchdown. During the game's final minutes the Ravens began a 92-yard drive, culminating in a 26-yard touchdown pass by quarterback Joe Flacco to wide receiver Torrey Smith leaving 8 seconds on the clock improving the Ravens’ record to 6–2.

Week 10: at Seattle Seahawks

With this loss, the Ravens fell to 6–3.

Week 11: vs. Cincinnati Bengals

With this win, the Ravens improved to 7–3.

Week 12: vs. San Francisco 49ersThanksgiving Day game'''

Coming off their divisional home win over the Bengals, head coach John Harbaugh and the Ravens stayed at home for a Week 12 interconference duel with the San Francisco 49ers and their head coach (John's brother) Jim Harbaugh, on Thanksgiving. (The game was jokingly nicknamed "The Harbaugh Bowl.")

Baltimore delivered the game's opening punch in the first quarter with a 39-yard field goal from kicker Billy Cundiff, but the 49ers answered with kicker David Akers getting a 45-yard field goal.  The Ravens regained the lead in the second quarter with a 23-yard field goal from Cundiff.

San Francisco began the third quarter with Akers nailing a 52-yard field goal, yet Baltimore regained the lead in the fourth quarter with quarterback Joe Flacco finding tight end Dennis Pitta on an 8-yard touchdown pass, followed by a 39-yard field goal from Cundiff.  Afterwards, the defense would hold to prevent any comeback attempt from the 49ers.

With this win, the Ravens improved to 8–3.

Linebacker Terrell Suggs (3 tackles, 3 sacks, & 1 forced fumble) was named NFL Network’s Puddin' Pie Award winner.

Week 13: at Cleveland Browns

The Ravens entered the game concerned that they would have trouble, having lost three matches in the year to teams with losing records on the road. This increased their determination. On their first possession, they came within field goal range on 4th and 1, and decided to attempt to convert, which failed. But on their next possession, Ray Rice scored a touchdown for a 7–0 lead. Billy Cundiff missed two moderate field goals in the first half, but toward the end, made one that increased the lead to 10–0. The Browns forced a fumble in the third quarter and capitalized on it with a field goal, cutting this lead to 10–3. But on the ensuing drive, Ray Rice, who rushed for over 200 yards in the entire game, had a 67-yard gain which led to a touchdown, increasing the lead to 17–3. They would later add to that cushion when Lardarius Webb returned a punt 68 yards for a touchdown. The Browns made one more touchdown, making what would be the final score of 24–10. But when the Ravens got their final possession, following the 2-minute warning, they were able to run out the clock as they won their seventh straight game over the Browns and improved to 9–3.

Week 14: vs. Indianapolis Colts

With this win, the Ravens improved to 10–3.

Week 15: at San Diego Chargers

With this loss, the Ravens fell to 10–4.

Week 16: vs. Cleveland Browns

With their 8th-straight win over the Browns, the Ravens improved to 11–4.

Week 17: at Cincinnati Bengals

Ray Rice took over the offensive by totaling 191 rushing yards and two long touchdowns on 24 carries in the Ravens' victory  that closed out the regular season at 12–4 and the team clinched first division crown since 2006. Rice's touchdown runs came on rushes of 70 and 51 yards and for the effort he was named the AFC's offensive player of the week by the NFL.  The Ravens also set records such as going 6–0 against division rivals and winning their 8th-straight division rival game as they swept the Bengals for the first time since 2008. The Ravens have played 6 Week 17 games against the Bengals since, losing five straight before finally defeating them in 2020.

Postseason

AFC Divisional Playoff Game: vs. Houston Texans

After a 60-yard return on the opening kick-off, the Texans drove the ball to the Baltimore 21 where they settled for a 40 field goal and took an early 3–0 lead. The Ravens go three and out and punt the ball back to Houston, but Texans punt returner Jacoby Jones misplays the punt and the Ravens recover inside the Houston 5-yard line. Joe Flacco would hit tight end Kris Wilson (his first catch of the season) for a touchdown and the Ravens took a lead they would never surrender. Baltimore dominated Houston's passing game, intercepting rookie quarterback T. J. Yates 3 times and held the Texans scoreless in the second half.  The Ravens committed no penalties during the game and never turned the ball over by fumble or interception.
Arian Foster ran for 132 yards, the first 100-yard plus performance ever against the Ravens in post season. After the game, Foster and Ray Lewis exchanged game jerseys.

AFC Championship: at New England Patriots

With the loss, the Ravens finished their season with a 13–5 record preventing them from reaching their 2nd Super bowl in 11 years.
Lee Evans failed to make the game-winning touchdown on 2nd & 1 and Billy Cundiff missed a 32-yard field goal with 0:11 left in regulation, which would have sent the game into overtime.

Awards
 Defensive Player of the Year Terrell Suggs.

References

External links
 Official website
 NFL.com profile

Baltimore
AFC North championship seasons
Baltimore Ravens seasons
Raven
2010s in Baltimore